Matki is a common name for the plant Vigna aconitifolia and its edible seeds

Matki may  also refer to:
 Matki (earthen pot)

 Places
Mątki, Pomeranian Voivodeship, Poland
Mątki, Warmian-Masurian Voivodeship, Poland